Oedophrys is a genus of true weevils in the beetle family Curculionidae. There are about six described species in Oedophrys, found in eastern Asia and eastern North America.

Species
These species belong to the genus Oedophrys:
 Oedophrys albofasciata Pajni, 1990
 Oedophrys convexifrons (Faust, 1897)
 Oedophrys deludens Marshall, 1941
 Oedophrys multituberculata Pajni, 1990
 Oedophrys rudis Marshall, 1941
 Oedophrys rufiscutallata Pajni, 1990

References

Further reading

 

Weevils